is the thirty-third single by Japanese recording artist Ken Hirai. The song was written and composed by Hirai and production was handled by Seiji Kameda. It was released on November 10, 2010, as the fourth single from Hirai's eighth studio album Japanese Singer. "Aishiteru" serves as theme song for the film Ghost: In Your Arms Again, a Japanese remake of the 1990 American film Ghost. The single includes two B-sides: "Air Cameraman," written and composed by Hirai, and "Unchained Melody," a cover of the 1965 The Righteous Brothers song, which was featured in the original Ghost.

The single was issued in both standard and limited editions. The limited edition was released in Enhanced CD format and includes live footage from Hirai's Ken's Bar concert in New York and the music video of "Sing Forever."

The single debuted at number 10 on the Oricon Daily Singles Chart on November 9, 2010, and climbed to number 7 on November 11, 2010. It peaked at number 9 on the Oricon Weekly Singles Chart with 18,137 copies sold. The single ranked at number 24 on the Oricon Monthly Singles Chart for the month of November 2010 with 28,056 copies sold.

Track listing

Charts and sales

References 

2010 songs
2010 singles
Ken Hirai songs
Songs written by Ken Hirai
Song recordings produced by Seiji Kameda
Defstar Records singles
Japanese film songs
Songs written by Hy Zaret
Songs with music by Alex North